RPM was a Canadian magazine that published the best-performing singles of Canada from 1964 to 2000. During 1991, twenty-two singles reached number one. Girl group Wilson Phillips achieved the first number-one single of the year, "Impulsive", while English band Genesis became the last act to peak at the summit during the year with "No Son of Mine". Sting, Gloria Estefan (without Miami Sound Machine), Londonbeat, Extreme, Bryan Adams, the Temptations, and Tom Cochrane earned their first Canadian chart-toppers in 1991. The two Canadians who peaked at number one this year were Bryan Adams and Tom Cochrane. Along with Mariah Carey and Rod Stewart, Adams reached the top spot with more than one single.

The longest-running number-one single of the year, as well as the best-performing single of year, was "(Everything I Do) I Do It for You" by Bryan Adams, which spent nine weeks at number one from 3 August to 28 September. Coupled with his other chart-topper in 1991, "Can't Stop This Thing We Started", he spent a total of 13 weeks—a quarter of the year—at number one. Mariah Carey attained the number-one position with "Someday" and "Emotions", giving her a run of five weeks at the summit, and those who peaked at number one for three or more weeks were Roxette, Rod Stewart, Extreme, Paula Abdul, and Genesis.

Chart history

Notes

See also
1991 in music
List of Canadian number-one albums of 1991
List of Billboard Hot 100 number ones of 1991 (United States)
List of Cashbox Top 100 number-one singles of 1991 (United States)
List of number-one singles from the 1990s (New Zealand)

References

External links
 Read about RPM Magazine at the AV Trust
 Search RPM charts here at Library and Archives Canada

 
1991 record charts
1991